Tag 26 (2002, duration of 18 minutes approx.) is the third short film by German director Andreas Samland. It is sometimes called by the English translation of the title "Day 26". It was shot about 70 km away from Berlin, close to the Polish border. The film featured almost no dialogue and actors' faces were hidden behind masks for most of the movie. The few words spoken in the movie are in German. The production budget was 2500 euros but the film overspent to 7000 euros. The director quotes Tarkovskij´s Stalker as the main influence for his film.

Cast and Crew:  	
 Cast: Ronnie Marzillier, Peter Beck
 Screenwriter/Director: Andreas Samland
 Editor: Andreas Samland, Wolfgang Gessat
 Cinematographer: Max Penzel
 Sound: Martin Frühmorgen
 Production Design: Doerte Maria Schreiterer
 Producers: M. Knapheide

Plot 

Twenty six days after an undescribed biological disaster, two survivors thereof are forced to live in cumbersome protective biohazard suits and scavenge for food, water and fuel in a desolate dead land. The two follow the incomprehensible sounds of the radio in search of fellow survivors. They stop for supplies at a farm house. One of the characters' suits is accidentally ripped, and when he is tested positively for poisoning he decides to remove his suit.  The other survivor prepares to leave, but when confronted with the prospect of spending the rest of his life alone and confined inside the biohazard suit, he chooses to return to his companion, who is already dying.  As his companion dies, he takes off the mask of his biohazard suit, dooming himself to die as well, but so he can share one final moment of humanity by letting his companion see him face to face before he dies.

Awards
Grand Chameleon Award 2003 - Brooklyn International Film Festival
Best Short 2003 (nominated) - Max Ophüls Festival
European Broadcasters Award (Short Film) 2003 - Brussels International Festival of Fantasy Film
Grand Prize 2004 (nominated) - Brussels International Festival of Fantasy Film.

See also

 Der Blindgänger
 Red Gourmet Pellzik

External links
 Interview with the director
 This page contains a brief clip of Tag 26
 

German drama short films
2000s German-language films
2000s German films